The Council of State Governments (CSG) is a nonpartisan, non-profit organization in the United States that serves all three branches of state government. 
Founded in 1933 by Colorado state Sen. Henry W. Toll, CSG is a region-based forum that fosters the exchange of insights and ideas to help state officials shape public policy.

The CSG National Headquarters is located in Lexington, Kentucky, but the council also operates regional offices in Atlanta, Chicago, New York City and Sacramento, California. CSG maintains an office in Washington, D.C. that monitors federal government activities and their impact on state issues and programs.

Other CSG services include policy academies, research briefs, webinars and annual conferences and meetings at the national and regional levels.

The CSG Justice Center, which is based in New York City and has offices across the country, provides  strategies to increase public safety and strengthen communities.

CSG national leadership includes a governor, who serves as the national president, and a member of a state legislature, who serves as national chair. CSG regions are chaired by state legislators.

CSG membership includes 56 U.S. states and territories; six Canadian provinces also partner with the council. Annual dues are paid by each state and territory to support the council's operations. In addition, revenue is derived from publication sales, registration fees, corporate grants and contributions, and investment income.

The CSG is considered part of the 'Big Seven', a group of organizations that represent local and state government in the United States.

History
In 1925, Henry Wolcott Toll, then a Colorado state senator, created the American Legislators’ Association, the forerunner to CSG, which provided legislators with information and opportunities to connect. Toll believed interstate cooperation was imperative for states to maintain control over inherent state issues.

CSG—the only national organization that serves all three branches of state government—was created in 1933. "Probably 12 or 15 of us sat around a table in a small room," Toll recalled 25 years later. "The Council of State Governments had never been heard of before that day."

About five years after CSG was conceived, a new building at 1313 East 60th St., in Chicago became the council's central home. In 1967, CSG and the Commonwealth of Kentucky entered into an agreement that provided CSG with a headquarters building in Lexington, Kentucky. The building was dedicated on June 9, 1969. In 1993, the state financed the construction of a second building to facilitate the council's continued growth.

Some CSG services have been offered since the early years. The Book of the States, which provides comprehensive data and analysis about state governments and their operations, was first published in 1935. State Government News, which later became the CSG bimonthly magazine, Capitol Ideas, was first published in 1958.

The Eastern Regional Conference was established in 1937. CSG opened a Washington, D.C. office in 1938. The Midwestern Legislative Conference was established in 1945. Both the Southern Conference—now the Southern Legislative Conference—and the Western Regional Conference—now CSG West—were established in 1947. In 2006, the CSG Justice Center was formed.

The CSG Henry Toll Fellowship program, a leadership development program for state officials, was established in 1986.

Timeline

 1925 – The American Legislators' Association was established in Denver, CO
 1930 – The headquarters of the American Legislators' Association moved to Chicago, IL
 1935 – The Council of State Governments (CSG) was established
 1937 – The Eastern Regional Conference (ERC) was established as the eastern regional office of CSG
 1938 – CSG opened a Washington D.C. office
 1945 – The Midwestern Legislative Conference (now a part of CSG Midwest) is established as the midwestern regional office of CSG
 1947 – The Southern Conference (now the Southern Legislative Conference) and the Western Regional Conference (now known as CSG West) are established to support CSG's work in the southern and western regions
 1969 – The CSG headquarters were moved to Lexington, KY
 1986 – The CSG Henry Toll Fellowship, a leadership development program for state officials was established
 2006 – The CSG Justice Center was formed out of the ERC justice program
 2015 – CSG rededicates its national headquarters after a $5.5 million renovation to the original headquarters building
 2016 – CSG changes address to 1776 Avenue of the States

Regional offices
CSG has 6 offices across the country including 4 regional offices, a federal affairs office in Washington D.C., and the headquarters office in Lexington, KY.

Justice Center

On December 3, 2006, The Council of State Governments' Governing Board voted to transform the Eastern Regional Conference's (CSG/ERC) criminal justice program into a national Justice Center. The Justice Center's Board of Directors includes state legislative leaders, judges, corrections administrators, juvenile justice agency directors, and law enforcement professionals, who together represent a cross-section of the senior-level state officials who shape criminal justice policy across the country. The Justice Center is headquartered in New York City with additional offices in Austin, Seattle, Bethesda, and Washington, D.C.

Affiliate organizations
Affiliate organizations contribute specialized expertise, information, resources and issues to the overall mission of CSG. In turn, CSG offers a mechanism by which affiliates may tap into CSG's products and services, and a forum for bringing issues to a broader, collective state audience.

Publications

Capitol Ideas (bimonthly magazine)
The Current State (weekly e-newsletter)
The Book of the States (published annually since 1935, provides data and analyses about state governments and their operations)
Shared State Legislation or SSL (annual volume that compiles legislation on topics of current importance to states)

Presidents and Chairs

See also
National Association of Counties
National Center for State Courts
National Conference of State Legislatures
National League of Cities

Notes

References 

 
 

Nonpartisan organizations in the United States
Government-related professional associations in the United States
1933 establishments in the United States
Organizations established in 1933
Organizations based in Lexington, Kentucky
Paradiplomacy